{
  "type": "FeatureCollection",
  "features": [
    {
      "type": "Feature",
      "properties": {
        "stroke": "#000000",
        "fill": "#ffa6ea",
        "title": "Strathmore, Manhasset",
        "stroke-width": 3
      },
      "geometry": {
        "type": "Polygon",
        "coordinates": [
          [
            [
              -73.66902878478868,
              40.79715137504272
            ],
            [
              -73.6687517995597,
              40.795884183878826
            ],
            [
              -73.66770684602672,
              40.79288222214849
            ],
            [
              -73.6675407717121,
              40.79227001508985
            ],
            [
              -73.67072854962318,
              40.79161824835269
            ],
            [
              -73.67167261385477,
              40.79152153241202
            ],
            [
              -73.67065519945756,
              40.78823798176518
            ],
            [
              -73.67051654968238,
              40.78757061970904
            ],
            [
              -73.67312827671414,
              40.7876401066177
            ],
            [
              -73.67552206706024,
              40.78730997089081
            ],
            [
              -73.67666365018523,
              40.78770343487952
            ],
            [
              -73.67843615749736,
              40.78751964073167
            ],
            [
              -73.67847341243761,
              40.78792742361042
            ],
            [
              -73.6789342226257,
              40.78875251295676
            ],
            [
              -73.68105448003918,
              40.78833618764206
            ],
            [
              -73.680791190709,
              40.78731296652951
            ],
            [
              -73.68281012073568,
              40.78705297116187
            ],
            [
              -73.68362895671454,
              40.78694252270037
            ],
            [
              -73.68559699156323,
              40.788064488286146
            ],
            [
              -73.68626273470001,
              40.788146963053975
            ],
            [
              -73.68676465550381,
              40.7884536495186
            ],
            [
              -73.68701686369604,
              40.789094836935625
            ],
            [
              -73.6859040115087,
              40.79009704564313
            ],
            [
              -73.68644942456741,
              40.79076449509812
            ],
            [
              -73.68718373265439,
              40.79082469351945
            ],
            [
              -73.68735991960422,
              40.791804626011114
            ],
            [
              -73.68784082769709,
              40.79415529593934
            ],
            [
              -73.69488221178472,
              40.79315702135429
            ],
            [
              -73.6957732467272,
              40.79631405121249
            ],
            [
              -73.68877700835584,
              40.797247122308775
            ],
            [
              -73.68907990414301,
              40.798327255879094
            ],
            [
              -73.68692625139376,
              40.79864605013948
            ],
            [
              -73.68609187844415,
              40.79439605171697
            ],
            [
              -73.67768828349655,
              40.79535147305786
            ],
            [
              -73.67275558848632,
              40.79631458164924
            ],
            [
              -73.66902878478868,
              40.79715137504272
            ]
          ]
        ]
      }
    }
  ]
}Strathmore is an unincorporated, Levitt & Sons-developed hamlet in the Town of North Hempstead in Nassau County, on the North Shore of Long Island, in New York, United States, within the census-designated place (CDP) of Manhasset. 

Although presently considered part of the Manhasset CDP, it remains distinct from the other areas of the CDP and the name continues to be widely-used and accepted both socially and politically.

The hamlet, which consists of 4 subdivisions, is also often referred to as The Strathmores.

The southern parts of Strathmore once attempted to incorporate as the Incorporated Village of Strathmore – but the proposal was voted down in a referendum vote. Because of the outcome of the referendum, all of Strathmore remains part of the unincorporated Manhasset CDP to this very day.

History

The southern Strathmores (South, Vanderbilt, & Village) 
Much of what is now the southern part of Strathmore was once part of the estate of Frank A. Munsey. Following his death, he bequeathed the land to the Metropolitan Museum of Art, which ultimately developed some of the land as Munsey Park and sold the area south of Northern Boulevard to the Vanderbilt family, and the land remained in Vanderbilt family ownership for roughly a decade; their mansion, which had previously been owned by Louis Sherry, is now the Strathmore–Vanderbilt Country Club. The residents in the Strathmore–Vanderbilt subdivision have deeded memberships to the country club.

In February 1944, a massive fire broke out in the shopping area of Strathmore Village (now the Americana Manhasset). The fire severely damaged 15 shops, along with the Levitt & Sons real estate office which was built only 2 years prior. The cost of the damage was estimated to be roughly $250,000 (1944 USD).

In the 1990s, residents in Strathmore grew concerned over the fate of the former Manhasset Club (which was originally known as the Village Bath Club). More than 1,000 residents petitioned for the club to be purchased by the Manhasset Park District to keep it operating as a public park. After that failed, residents attempted to have the Town of North Hempstead landmark the club's main building, which was designed to resemble a California hunting lodge designed by Frank Lloyd Wright. The North Hempstead Landmarks Commission ultimately denied their requests, claiming that the building was not a landmark. Ultimately the building (and the rest of the 2.5-acre (1.0 ha) property) was soon demolished and replaced with new homes.

Failed incorporation attempt 
Between 1949 and 1950, the residents of southern part of Strathmore proposed incorporating their three subdivisions as a single village, which would have been known as the "Incorporated Village of Strathmore." These plans were unsuccessful, as voters rejected the plan 742-to-248 during the referendum vote. Under standard protocol in New York, more than half of the voters would have had to approve of the plan in order for Strathmore to be incorporated.

Northern Boulevard Bypass controversy, 1956 
In the 1950s, the New York State Department of Public Works proposed constructing a Manhasset Bypass (also known as the Miracle Mile Bypass) from East Shore Road to Manhasset Woods Road, crossing Whitney Pond and Shelter Rock Road, and its easternmost portions would have sliced diagonally through the southwestern part of South Strathmore. The bypass would have carried New York State Route 25A, shifting its alignment slightly south of its current one. 

The proposal would have created a four-lane or six-lane bypass of the western half of the Miracle Mile, and would have cost roughly $5,000,000 to $8,000,000 (1956 USD). Roughly 10 homes in South Strathmore would have been acquired through eminent domain – in addition to the taking of portions of property from two churches as well as from the Munsey Park Elementary School in neighboring Munsey Park. It also would have severed one of the South Strathmore subdivision's major entrances/exits.

This caused many Strathmore residents to protest its construction, and ultimately the proposal was scrapped by politicians in Albany.

North Strathmore 

The area which is now North Strathmore was formerly owned by Horatio Gates Onderdonk, who was of the prominent Long Island family of the same name. It was sold to Levitt & Sons in 1933; the firm soon would begin developing the area.

In the late 1940s, there was a controversial, failed proposal to build a 3-acre park in the North Strathmore area. It was argued that all of Greater Manhasset would be paying for a park which only North Strathmore residents would be able to use. The $45,000 (1949 USD) bond referendum was ultimately voted down, and subsequently the Manhasset Park District never built the park.

The historic Horatio Gates Onderdonk House, which was turned into the neighborhood's centerpiece by Levitt, underwent an extensive rehabilitation in the 1980s.

Geography 

Strathmore consists of 4 well-defined subdivisions: North Strathmore, South Strathmore, Strathmore–Vanderbilt, and Strathmore Village. The southern portions form the Manhasset CDP's large, eastern panhandle.

The hamlet is part of the Greater Manhasset area.

Government

Town representation 
As an unincorporated area within North Hempstead, Strathmore is governed directly by the Town of North Hempstead, which is headquartered in Manhasset. Strathmore is represented on the Town Board by Veronica Lurvey (D–Great Neck) and is located within North Hempstead's 4th Council District.

Representation in higher government

County representation 
Strathmore is located within the Nassau County Legislature's 9th district, which as of June 2022 is represented by Richard Nicoello (R–New Hyde Park).

State representation

New York State Senate 
Strathmore is located entirely within New York's 7th State Senate district, which as of June 2022 is represented by Anna Kaplan (D–North Hills).

New York State Assembly 
Strathmore is located entirely within New York's 16th State Assembly district, which as of June 2022 is represented by Gina Sillitti (D–Manorhaven).

Federal representation

United States Congress 
Strathmore is located entirely within New York's 3rd Congressional district, which as of June 2022 is represented by Tom Suozzi (D–Glen Cove).

United States Senate 
As with the rest of New York, Strathmore is represented in the United States Senate by Kirsten Gillibrand (D) and Charles Schumer (D).

Politics 
In the 2016 U.S. presidential election, the majority of Strathmore voters voted for Donald Trump (R).

Education

School district 
Strathmore in its entirety is served by the Manhasset Union Free School District. Elementary school students in grades K–5 either attend Munsey Park Elementary School or Shelter Rock Elementary School, depending on where they live within Strathmore. All students attend the Manhasset Secondary School for grades 6–12.

Library district 
Strathmore is located within the boundaries of the Manhasset Library District.

Infrastructure

Transportation

Roads 
Northern Boulevard (New York State Route 25A) passes through and serves Strathmore and forms portions of its northern border with Munsey Park.

Other major streets which are either partially or wholly within the hamlet include Country Club Drive, East Gate, Harrow Lane, Pickwick Road, Searingtown Road, The Gate, and Village Road.

Rail 
No rail lines pass through Strathmore. The nearest Long Island Rail Road station to the village is Manhasset on the Port Washington Branch.

Bus 
Strathmore is served by the n20H and n21 bus routes, which are operated by Nassau Inter-County Express (NICE). These two bus routes travel through the area via Northern Boulevard.

Utilities

Natural gas 
National Grid USA provides natural gas to homes and businesses that are hooked up to natural gas lines in Strathmore.

Power 
PSEG Long Island provides power to all homes and businesses within Strathmore.

Sewage 
Strathmore is primarily unsewered, although some portions of the hamlet zoned for business, such as the Americana Manhasset, are connected to the Great Neck Water Pollution Control District's sanitary sewers via a sewer main underneath Northern Boulevard. All unsewered areas of the neighborhood rely on cesspools and septic systems, as opposed to sanitary sewers.

Water 
Strathmore is located within the boundaries of the Manhasset–Lakeville Water District, which provides the entirety of the neighborhood with water.

Landmarks 
 Horatio Gates Onderdonk House – a historic home formerly owned by Horatio Gates Onderdonk; it is listed on the National Register of Historic Places and is the centerpiece of the North Strathmore subdivision.

Notable person 

 Norman F. Penny – Banker, broker, and politician who served in the New York State Assembly from 1938 to 1942; major Republican figure in Nassau County. Lived on Rocky Wood Road in North Strathmore.

See also 

 List of Levitt & Sons housing developments on Long Island

References

External links 

 North Strathmore Association website

Manhasset, New York
Town of North Hempstead, New York
Levittown